British Airways Flight 009, sometimes referred to by its callsign Speedbird 9 or as the Jakarta incident, was a scheduled British Airways flight from London Heathrow to Auckland, with stops in Bombay, Kuala Lumpur, Perth, and Melbourne.

On 24 June 1982, the route was flown by the City of Edinburgh, a Boeing 747-200 registered as G-BDXH. Partly because the event occurred at night, obscuring the cloud, the reason for the failure was not immediately apparent to the crew or air traffic control. The aircraft was diverted to Jakarta in the hope that enough engines could be restarted to allow it to land there. The aircraft glided out of the ash cloud, and all engines were restarted (although one failed again soon after), allowing the aircraft to land safely at the Halim Perdanakusuma Airport in Jakarta.

The crew members of the accident segment had boarded the aircraft in Kuala Lumpur, while many of the passengers had been aboard since the flight began in London.

Incident

At the time of the incident, the flight crew of BA009 consisted of 32-year-old Senior First Officer Roger Greaves, 40-year-old Senior Engineer Officer Barry Townley-Freeman, and 41-year-old Captain Eric Henry Moody. The flight crew members had boarded the aircraft at Sultan Abdul Aziz Shah Airport in Kuala Lumpur and were due to pilot the 747 from the Malaysia to Perth Airport leg.

Shortly after 13:40 UTC (20:40 Jakarta time) above the Indian Ocean, south of Java, the crew first noticed an unusual effect on the windscreen  similar to St. Elmo's fire, while Moody was heading to the lavatory. Despite the weather radar showing clear skies, the crew switched on engine anti-ice and the passenger seat belt signs as a precaution.

As the flight progressed, smoke began to accumulate in the passenger cabin of the aircraft; it was first assumed to be cigarette smoke. However, it soon began to grow thicker and had an odour of sulphur. Passengers who had a view of the aircraft's engines through the window noted that they were unusually bright blue, with light shining forward through the fan blades and producing a stroboscopic effect.

Around 13:42 UTC (20:42 Jakarta time), the number-four Rolls-Royce RB211 engine began surging and soon flamed out. The flight crew immediately performed the engine shutdown drill, quickly cutting off fuel supply and arming the fire extinguishers. Less than a minute later, at 13:43 UTC (20:43 Jakarta time), engine two surged and flamed out. Within seconds, and almost simultaneously, engines one and three flamed out, prompting the flight engineer to exclaim, "I don't believe it—all four engines have failed!"

Without engine thrust, a 747-200 has a glide ratio of roughly 15:1, meaning it can glide forward 15 kilometres for every kilometre it drops. At 13:44 UTC (20:44 Jakarta time), Greaves declared an emergency to the local air traffic control authority, stating that all four engines had failed. However, Jakarta Area Control misunderstood the message, interpreting the call as meaning that only engine number four had shut down. After a nearby Garuda Indonesia flight relayed the message to them, air traffic control correctly understood the urgent message. Despite the crew "squawking" the emergency transponder setting of 7700, air traffic control could not locate the 747 on their radar screens.

Many passengers, fearing for their lives, wrote notes to relatives.

Owing to the high Indonesian mountains on the south coast of the island of Java, an altitude of at least  was required to cross the coast safely. The crew decided that if the aircraft was unable to maintain altitude by the time they reached , they would turn back out to sea and attempt to ditch into the Indian Ocean. The restart attempts failed.

Despite the lack of time, Moody made an announcement to the passengers that has been described as "a masterpiece of understatement":

As pressure within the cabin fell, oxygen masks dropped from the ceiling – an automatic emergency measure to make up for the lack of air. On the flight deck, however, Greaves's mask was broken; the delivery tube had detached from the rest of the mask. Moody swiftly decided to descend at 1,800 m per minute to an altitude where there was enough pressure in the outside atmosphere to breathe almost normally.

At , the crew was approaching the altitude at which they would have to turn over the ocean and attempt a risky ditching. Although the crew had guidelines for the water landing procedure, no one had ever tried it in a Boeing 747. As they performed the engine restart procedure, engine number four finally started, and at 13:56 UTC (20:56 Jakarta time), Moody used its power to reduce the rate of descent. Shortly thereafter, engine three restarted, allowing him to climb slowly. Shortly after that, engines one and two successfully restarted, as well. The crew subsequently requested and expedited an increase in altitude to clear the high mountains of Indonesia.

As the aircraft approached its target altitude, the St. Elmo's fire effect on the windscreen returned. Moody throttled back, but engine number two surged again and was shut down. The crew immediately descended and held .

As Flight 009 approached Jakarta's Halim Perdanakusuma International Airport, the crew found  seeing anything through the windscreen difficult, and made the approach almost entirely on instruments, despite reports of good visibility. The crew decided to fly the instrument landing system, but the vertical guidance system was inoperative, so they were forced to fly with only the lateral guidance as the first officer monitored the airport's distance-measuring equipment (DME). He then called out how high they should be at each DME step along the final approach to the runway, creating a virtual glide slope for them to follow. Moody described it as "a bit like negotiating one's way up a badger's arse." Although the runway lights could be made out through a small strip of the windscreen, the landing lights on the aircraft seemed to be inoperable. After landing, the flight crew found taxiing impossible, due to glare from apron floodlights, which made the already sandblasted windscreen opaque.

Investigation

Postflight investigation revealed that City of Edinburghs problems had been caused by flying through a cloud of volcanic ash from the eruption of Mount Galunggung. Because the ash cloud was dry, it did not appear on the weather radar, which was designed to detect the moisture in clouds. The dust in the cloud deprived the engines of sufficient oxygen from the atmosphere to maintain combustion, sandblasted the windscreen and landing-light covers, and clogged the engines. As the ash entered the engines, it melted in the combustion chambers and adhered to the inside of the power plant. As the engine cooled from inactivity, and as the aircraft descended out of the ash cloud, the molten ash solidified and enough of it broke off for air to again flow smoothly through the engine, allowing a successful restart. The engines had enough electrical power to restart because one generator and the on-board batteries were still operating; electrical power was required for cranking and ignition of the engines.

Aftermath
Engines one, two, and three were replaced at Jakarta, as was the windscreen, and the fuel tanks were cleared of the ash that had entered them through the pressurization ducts, contaminating the fuel and requiring that it be discarded. After the aircraft was ferried back to London, engine number four was replaced and major work was undertaken to return the 747 to service.

Although the airspace around Mount Galunggung was closed temporarily after the accident, it was reopened days later. Only after a Singapore Airlines 747 was forced to shut down three of its engines while flying through the same area 19 days later (13 July) did Indonesian authorities close the airspace permanently and reroute airways to avoid the area; a watch was set up to monitor clouds of ash. Flight 009 was not the first encounter with this eruption; a Garuda DC-9 had encountered ash on 5 April 1982.

The crew received various awards, including the Queen's Commendation for Valuable Service in the Air for Moody, and medals from the British Airline Pilots' Association. G-BDXH's engineless flight entered the Guinness Book of Records as the longest glide in a non-purpose-built aircraft (this record was later broken by Air Canada Flight 143 in 1983 and Air Transat Flight 236 in 2001).

One of the passengers, Betty Tootell, wrote a book about the accident, All Four Engines Have Failed, having managed to trace some 200 of the 247 passengers on the flight. In 1993, Tootell married fellow passenger James Ferguson, who had been seated in the row in front of her. She later noted: "The 28th December 2006 marks the start of our 14th year of honeymoon, and on the 24th June 2007, many passengers and crew will no doubt gather to celebrate the 25th anniversary of our mid-air adventure."

British Airways continued to operate the Flight 009 route from London Heathrow to Sydney, but in March 2012, the route was curtailed to Bangkok, and the aircraft operating this route is now a Boeing 777-200ER. City of Edinburgh, later renamed City of Elgin, continued to fly for British Airways after the accident, before being sold to European Aviation Air Charter. The aircraft was taken out of service in February 2004, and in July 2009, the then-30-year-old aircraft was broken up at a breaking facility at Bournemouth International Airport.

In popular culture 
The Discovery Channel Canada / National Geographic TV series Mayday featured Flight 009 in a 2007 episode titled "Falling From the Sky" which featured interviews with the flight crew and passengers, and a dramatization of the flight.

A similar situation also appeared in the first episode of The Centimeter of Love, a Chinese drama, produced in 2020.

See also
 KLM Flight 867 – a nearly identical incident occurred to a Boeing 747 in Alaska in 1989
 List of airline flights that required gliding
 Volcanic ash and aviation safety

References

Further reading

External links
The incident over Java in 1982: Website of Captain Eric Moody
FlightPodcast.com: Audio Interview with Captain Eric Moody

Accidents and incidents involving the Boeing 747
Airliner accidents and incidents caused by engine failure
Airliner accidents and incidents caused by volcanic events
Aviation accidents and incidents in 1982
Aviation accidents and incidents in Indonesia
9
1982 in Indonesia
June 1982 events in Asia
1982 disasters in Indonesia